Satinese (Saatinwaa in Satinese) (Shatianhua in Putonghua) is a dialect of Yue Chinese. It is spoken by roughly half of the population of Chungsan (Zhongshan), Guangdong, in Namtau, Wongpo, Fausa, Manchung, Gonghau, Tungsing, Tungfung, Siulaam, Wanglan, Salong, Panfu, Sanwan and Tanchau. 

It differs from Standard Cantonese. Some subdialects among the Satin dialect are similar to Suntak dialect. Satin Regions in Chungsan are populated with Tanka people and the language is one of the major branches of Tanka dialect.

References 

Yue Chinese
Zhongshan